Estehsar (also Romanized as Astehsar; also known as Estesar) is a village in Khoshabar Rural District, in the Central District of Rezvanshahr County, Gilan Province, Iran. At the 2006 census, its population was 138, in 35 families.

References 

Populated places in Rezvanshahr County